Brzęczek is a settlement in the administrative district in Poland.

Brzęczek may also refer to:
 Jerzy Brzęczek, a Polish professional football manager and former player
 Richard J. Brzeczek, a former law enforcement official